Malati Rava Roy is an Indian politician. She was elected to the West Bengal Legislative Assembly from Tufanganj as a member of the Bharatiya Janata Party.

Career
Roy is from Kotwali, Cooch Behar district. Her husband's name is Indra Mohan Rava. She contested 2021 West Bengal Legislative Assembly election from Tufanganj Vidhan Sabha and won the seat on 2 May 2021.

References

Living people
21st-century Indian politicians
People from Cooch Behar district
Bharatiya Janata Party politicians from West Bengal
West Bengal MLAs 2021–2026
Year of birth missing (living people)